Alsodes tumultuosus is a species of frog in the family Alsodidae.
It is endemic to Farellones in central Chile.
Its natural habitats are temperate grassland and rivers.
It is threatened by habitat loss.

References

tumultuosus
Amphibians of Chile
Amphibians of the Andes
Endemic fauna of Chile
Taxonomy articles created by Polbot
Amphibians described in 1979